Elections to Liverpool Town Council were held on Wednesday 1 November 1862. One third of the council seats were up for election, the term of office of each councillor being three years.

Eleven of the sixteen wards were uncontested.

This was the first year that the 'Proceedings of the Council' were printed.

After the election, the composition of the council was:

Election result

Because eleven of the sixteen seats were uncontested, these statistics should be taken in that context.

Ward results

* - Retiring Councillor seeking re-election

Abercromby

Castle Street

Everton

Exchange

Great George

Lime Street

North Toxteth

Pitt Street

Rodney Street

St. Anne Street

St. Paul's

St. Peter's

Scotland

South Toxteth

Vauxhall

West Derby

Aldermanic Elections

At the meeting of the Council on 10 November 1862, the terms of office of eight 
alderman expired.

The following eight were elected as Aldermen by the Council 
(Aldermen and Councillors) on 10 November 1862 for a term of six years.

* - re-elected aldermen.

By-elections

No. 15, South Toxteth, November 1862

Caused by the election of Councillor John Farnworth (Conservative, South Toxteth, elected 
1 November 1861) by the Council as an alderman on 10 November 1862.

No. 1, Everton & Kirkdale, November 1862

Caused by the election of Councillor Maurice Hubback (Conservative, Everton & Kirkdale, elected 
1 November 1862) by the Council as an alderman on 10 November 1862.

No. ?, November 1862

Caused by the election of Councillor John Grant Morris (Party?, ward?, elected ???) by the Council as an 
alderman on 10 November 1862.

See also

 Liverpool City Council
 Liverpool Town Council elections 1835 - 1879
 Liverpool City Council elections 1880–present
 Mayors and Lord Mayors of Liverpool 1207 to present
 History of local government in England

References

1862
1862 English local elections
November 1862 events
1860s in Liverpool